Jay Gorter (born 30 May 2000) is a Dutch professional footballer who plays as a goalkeeper for Aberdeen on loan from Eredivisie club Ajax.

Career

Go Ahead Eagles
Born in Amsterdam, Gorter played youth football for FC Purmerend (until 2010), Ajax (2010–2014), Amsterdamsche FC (2014–2015) and AZ Alkmaar (2015–2018) before joining Go Ahead Eagles in 2018. He made his debut for the club on 29 October 2019 in a 3–1 win at fellow Eerste Divisie club Almere City FC. On 16 December 2019, he signed his first professional contract with the club, lasting for two-and-a-half years. However, following behavioral problems with staff and fellow players, he was demoted to the under-19 team. Gorter made 40 appearances across the 2020–21 season in all competitions and kept 25 league clean sheets, a league record, as Go Ahead Eagles were promoted to the Eredivisie.

Ajax
On 12 June 2021, it was announced that Gorter would join AFC Ajax on a four-year contract, effective from 1 July 2021. Mainly appearing for Jong Ajax in the second division, he made his first-team debut for Ajax on 22 January 2022 in a KNVB Cup game against Excelsior Maassluis.

For the 2022 Johan Cruyff Shield on 30 July 2022, Gorter was chosen as a starter in favour of the experienced Remko Pasveer, who had been struggling with injuries during pre-season. He was criticised for his involvement in two goals conceded while Ajax lost the match 5–3.

On 31 January 2023, Gorter signed for Scottish Premiership club Aberdeen on loan until the end of the season.

Career statistics

References

External links
 Career stats - Voetbal International
 
 

2000 births
Living people
Dutch footballers
People from Purmerend
Footballers from North Holland
Association football goalkeepers
AZ Alkmaar players
Go Ahead Eagles players
AFC Ajax players
Aberdeen F.C. players
Eerste Divisie players
Eredivisie players
Dutch expatriate footballers
Expatriate footballers in Scotland
Dutch expatriate sportspeople in Scotland
Scottish Professional Football League players